Daane Anaar Ke is a Hindi-language Indian television mini-series that aired on DD National channel from 1994 to 1995.

The show is based on "Kissa Mussadilal" by Uma Vachaspati 'Madhurani'. The screenplay and dialogues were written by Sharad Joshi.

Plot 
The show focuses on a middle-class family that has just won a lottery, and chronicles how the behavior of their neighbors and relatives changes in response to their new-found smurf. The show also interviews the family to evaluate their reactions to these changes and finally how do they cope with the changes.

Cast 
 Shailendra Goel as Musaddilal
 Neena Gupta as the wife
 Alok Nath as Babuji
 Ajit Vachhani

References

External links 

DD National original programming
Indian drama television series
1990s Indian television miniseries
1994 Indian television series debuts
1995 Indian television series endings
Indian comedy television series
Gulzar
Television shows based on Indian novels